Alano Herberto Miller (born 1980) is an American actor. He is best known for his role as Cato on the short-lived WGN America drama series Underground.

Early life 
Miller was born and raised in Orlando, Florida, U.S. Miller is of Cuban, Bahamian, and Jamaican descent. Miller attended Seabreeze High School in Daytona Beach, Florida where he worked as a lifeguard and played basketball and football. In his adolescent years, Miller struggled with weight and body image.

Education 
Miller earned a Bachelor of Fine Arts degree from SUNY Purchase Conservatory of Theater Arts and Film. In 2008, Miller earned a Master of Fine Arts degree from Penn State University.

Career 
In 2012, Miller's film career began in All Wifed Out. 
Miller is known for his role in the 2016 film Loving. In December 2016, Miller was nominated for the 48th NAACP Image Award for Outstanding Supporting Actor in a Motion Picture.

Personal life 
Miller currently resides in Pasadena, California. On June 26, 2009 he married fellow actor DeWanda Wise after three months of dating. Both Miller and Wise are vegan.

Filmography

Film

Television

Awards and recognitions
 1997 Presidential Scholar Award

See also 
 NAACP Image Award for Outstanding Supporting Actor in a Motion Picture

References

External links 
 
 
 Alano Miller at monarchmagazine.com
 Alano Miller at allamericanspeakers.com

Living people
American male film actors
American male television actors
21st-century American male actors
1980 births
Male actors from Orlando, Florida
American entertainers of Cuban descent
American actors of Jamaican descent
American people of Bahamian descent
Hispanic and Latino American male actors
People from Daytona Beach, Florida
State University of New York at Purchase alumni
University of Pennsylvania alumni